Amelanchier lamarckii, also called juneberry, serviceberry or shadbush, is a large deciduous flowering shrub or small tree in the family Rosaceae.

Description 
In spring the plant unfurls new leaves and produces star-shaped white flowers. The leaves are pink when they first open, maturing to yellow-green, and turn red in autumn. The plant's young berry-like pome fruits are dark red when young, but become dark purple when ripe.

Taxonomy 
This form is an apomictic microspecies presumed to be of hybrid origin (A. laevis and either A. arborea or A. canadensis); therefore under the rules of botanical nomenclature, it would be known as Amelanchier × lamarckii. The Latin specific epithet honors the French naturalist Jean-Baptiste Lamarck (1744–1829).

The European common name snowy mespilus (a name which is also attached to the related A. ovalis) reflects its close relationship with the medlar genus, Mespilus. It is also known as snowy mespil.

Distribution and habitat 
The plants are originally from eastern Canada and widely naturalised in Europe. There has been some escape within North America of plants apparently secondarily derived from those European forms.

Ecology
The fruit is eaten by birds soon after it ripens.

Cultivation
The species is widely cultivated as an ornamental plant. It has gained the Royal Horticultural Society's Award of Garden Merit.

Uses
Like other species of Amelanchier, the fruits are edible with a sweet flavor.

References

External links

 
 Information from the Missouri Botanical Garden

lamarckii
Plants described in 1968